Ohmwork is the third studio album by American heavy metal band GZR. It was originally released on May 10, 2005 in the United States and on May 9, 2005 in the United Kingdom. The album is the first to feature Chad Smith on drums, replacing Deen Castronovo from the band's previous album Black Science. The artwork was done by Lawrence Azarad of LAdesign.

Track listing
"Misfit"  – 3:24
"Pardon My Depression"  – 4:38
"Prisoner 103"  – 3:09
"I Believe"  – 6:55
"Aural Sects"  – 4:36
"Pseudocide"  – 2:30
"Pull the String"  – 3:50
"Alone"  – 4:38
"Dogs of Whore"  – 5:03
"Don't You Know"  – 4:57

Credits 
 Geezer Butler – bass guitar
 Pedro Howse – guitar
 Clark Brown – vocals
 Chad Smith – drums
 Lisa Rieffel – vocals on "Pseudocide"
 Produced by Geezer Butler
 Engineered by Jason McEntire
 Additional engineering by Chris Hughes
 Recorded at Shock City Music Work
 Mixed by Toby Wright
 Assisted by James Musshom
 Mixed at Skip Saylor Recording
 Mastered by Stephen Marcussen at Marcusen Mastering LLC
 All songs written by Butler/Howse/Brown.

References

External links 
Ohmwork at Geezer Butler's Website
Ohmwork at Black Sabbath Online

GZR albums